The Museo Civico di Zoologia is a natural history museum in Rome, central Italy. It is situated next to the Bioparc (Zoo) and can be entered by the Zoo or through the entrance on via Ulisse Aldrovandi. Founded in 1932, it is said to continue the natural history tradition of the Gabinetto di Zoologia dell'Università Pontificia and the collections date from 1792.

Importance
It is recognized as an institute of national importance by the Ministero per la Università e la Ricerca Scientifica. There are collections of entomology, malacology, osteology, ornithology, herpetology, ichthyology and mammalology.There are five million specimens in total( molluscs, insects, birds and mammals and fossils). The displays are modern, with over 1000 square metres of multi-sensorial or interactive stations exhibitions and three-dimensional reconstructions.
A biodiversity display includes sections on the significance of sex in the animal world; adaptations in borderline environments and ecosystems. other displays are more traditional with two ornithology halls a gallery on  "Arrigoni degli Oddi" and two halls of mammals.

The museum contains the zoological collections of  Conte Arrigoni degli Oddi.

Convention
The museum is the result of a convention made between the municipality of Rome and the Sapienza University of Rome . It is one of  three centres, second in the university, conserves specimens  of invertebrates and vertebrates including fish, amphibians and small mammals. It is at Museo di Zoologia, Università degli Studi di Roma "La Sapienza, Viale dell'Università 32, 00100 Roma. The third, at Via Catone, contains entomological collections retained by the university.

References

External links
  
  
 

Natural history museums in Italy
Museums in Rome
Museums established in 1932
Rome Q. III Pinciano